Delores LaVern Baker (November 11, 1929 – March 10, 1997) was an American R&B singer who had several hit records on the pop chart in the 1950s and early 1960s. Her most successful records were "Tweedle Dee" (1955), "Jim Dandy" (1956), and "I Cried a Tear" (1958).

Baker was inducted into the Rock and Roll Hall of Fame in 1991. The Hall remarked that her "fiery fusion of blues, jazz and R&B showcased her alluring vocals and set the stage for the rock and roll surge of the Fifties". Between 1955 and 1965, 20 of her songs made the R&B charts. Over the years, Elvis Presley recorded eight Baker songs.

Early life
Baker was born Delores Evans in Chicago. She was raised in Calumet City, Illinois. Under her mother's new surname, McMurley, Delores – on December 23, 1948, at age , in Cook County, Illinois – married Eugene Williams.

Career
Baker began singing in Chicago clubs such as the Club DeLisa around 1946, often billed as Little Miss Sharecropper, and first recorded under that name in 1949. She changed her name briefly to Bea Baker when recording for Okeh Records in 1951 and then was billed as LaVern Baker when she sang with Todd Rhodes and his band in 1952.

In 1953 she signed with Atlantic Records as a solo artist, her first release being "Soul on Fire". Her first hit came in early 1955, with the Latin-tempo "Tweedle Dee", which reached number 4 on the R&B chart and number 14 on the national US pop chart. Georgia Gibbs recorded a note-for-note cover of the song, which reached number 1; subsequently Baker made an unsuccessful attempt to sue her and petitioned Congress to consider such covers copyright violations.

Baker had a succession of hits on the R&B charts over the next couple of years with her backing group, the Gliders, including "Bop-Ting-a-Ling" (number 3 R&B), "Play It Fair" (number 2 R&B), and "Still" (number 4 R&B). At the end of 1956 she had another hit with "Jim Dandy" (number 1 R&B, number 17 pop), which sold over one million copies and was certified as a gold disc. Further hits followed for Atlantic, including the follow-up "Jim Dandy Got Married" (number 7 R&B), "I Cried a Tear" (number 2 R&B, number 6 pop in 1958, with sax by King Curtis), "I Waited Too Long" (number 5 R&B, number 3 pop, written by Neil Sedaka), "Saved" (number 17 R&B, written by Jerry Leiber and Mike Stoller), and "See See Rider" (number 9 R&B in 1963). In addition to singing, she did some work with Ed Sullivan and Alan Freed on TV and in films, including Rock, Rock, Rock and Mr. Rock & Roll. In 1964, she recorded a Bessie Smith tribute album. She then left Atlantic for Brunswick Records, for which she recorded the album Let Me Belong to You. 

Baker toured Australia in 1957 as part of Lee Gordon's Big Show, performing with a number of rock 'n' roll bands including Bill Haley and the Comets. She appeared in the film Rock, Rock, Rock! (1956).

In 1966, Baker recorded a duet single with Jackie Wilson. The controversial song, "Think Twice", featured raunchy lyrics considered inappropriate for airplay at that time or even today. Three versions were recorded, one of which is the version with the raunchy lyrics.

After divorcing Eugene Williams in the fall of 1958, Baker married the comedian Slappy White February 19, 1959, in Baltimore. After the couple was divorced in 1969, Baker signed on for a USO tour. She became seriously ill with bronchial pneumonia after a trip to Vietnam. While recovering at the U.S. naval base at Subic Bay, in the Philippines, a friend recommended that she stay on as the entertainment director at the Marine Corps Staff NCO club there. She remained there for 22 years, returning to the United States after the base was closed in 1988.

In 1988, she performed at Madison Square Garden for Atlantic Records' 40th anniversary. She then worked on the soundtracks of the films Shag (1989), Dick Tracy (1990) and A Rage in Harlem (1991), all of which were issued on CD. She performed a song for Alan Parker's film Angel Heart (1987), which appeared on the original vinyl soundtrack album but was not included on the later CD issue "for contractual reasons".

In 1990, she made her Broadway debut, replacing Ruth Brown as the star of the hit musical Black and Blue. In 1991, Rhino Records released a new album, Live in Hollywood, recorded at the Hollywood Roosevelt Cinegrill, and a compilation of her greatest Atlantic hits, Soul on Fire. In 1992, she recorded a well-received studio album, Woke Up This Morning, for DRG Records. She continued performing after both legs were amputated because of complications due to diabetes in 1994. Baker made her last recording, "Jump into the Fire," for the 1995 Harry Nilsson tribute CD, For the Love of Harry, on the Music Masters label.

In 1990 Baker was among the first eight recipients of the Pioneer Award from the Rhythm and Blues Foundation. In 1991, she became the second female solo artist inducted into the Rock and Roll Hall of Fame, following Aretha Franklin in 1987. Her song "Jim Dandy" was named one of the Rock and Roll Hall of Fame's 500 Songs That Shaped Rock and Roll and was ranked number 343 on Rolling Stone magazine's list of the 500 Greatest Songs of All Time. In 2020 Baker was inducted into the National Rhythm & Blues Hall of Fame

Death
Baker died of cardiovascular disease on March 10, 1997, at the age of 67. She was buried in an unmarked plot in Maple Grove Cemetery, in Kew Gardens, New York. Local historians raised funds for a headstone, which was erected on May 4, 2008.

Discography

Singles

Albums

LaVern (1956)

Side A
"Lots and Lots of Love"
"Of Course I Do"
"You'll Be Crying"
"Miracles"
"I'm in a Crying Mood"
"Mine All Mine"

Side B
"Harbor Lights"
"I'll Never Be Free"
"Romance in the Dark"
"Everybody's Somebody's Fool"
"How Long Will It Be"
"Fool That I Am"

LaVern Baker (1957)

Side A
"Jim Dandy"
"Tra La La"
"I Can't Love You Enough"
"Get Up, Get Up (You Sleepy Head)"
"That's All I Need"
"Bop-Ting-a-Ling"
"Tweedlee Dee"

Side B
"Still"
"Play It Fair"
"Tomorrow Night"
"That Lucky Old Sun"
"Soul on Fire"
"My Happiness Forever"
"How Can You Leave a Man Like This?"

LaVern Baker Sings Bessie Smith (1958)

Side A
"Gimme a Pigfoot (And a Bottle of Beer)"
"Baby Doll"
"On Revival Day"
"Money Blues"
"I Ain't Gonna Play No Second Fiddle"
"Back Water Blues"

Side B
"Empty Bed Blues"
"There'll Be a Hot Time in the Old Town Tonight"
"Nobody Knows You When You're Down and Out"
"After You've Gone"
"Young Woman's Blues"
"Preaching the Blues"

Blues Ballads (1959)

Side A
"I Cried a Tear"
"If You Love Me"
"You're Teasing Me"
"Love Me Right"
"Dix-a-Billy"
"So High So Low"

Side B
"I Waited Too Long"
"Why Baby Why"
"Humpty Dumpty Heart"
"It's So Fine"
"Whipper Snapper"
"St. Louis Blues"

Precious Memories: LaVern Baker Sings Gospel (1959)

Side A
"Precious Memories"
"Carrying the Cross for My Boss"
"Just a Closer Walk with Thee"
"Touch Me, Lord Jesus"
"Didn't It Rain"
"Precious Lord"

Side B
"Somebody Touched Me"
"In the Upper Room"
"Journey to the Sky"
"Everytime I Feel the Spirit"
"Too Close"
"Without a God"

Saved (1961)

Side A
"Saved"
"For Love of You"
"Manana"
"My Time Will Come"
"Shadows of Love"
"Must I Cry Again"

Side B
"Bumble Bee"
"Shake a Hand"
"Don Juan"
"Wheel of Fortune"
"Senor Big and Fine"
"Eternally"

See See Rider (1963)

Side A
"See See Rider"
"You Better Stop"
"He's a Real Gone Guy"
"Story of My Love"
"You Said"
"I'm Leavin' You"

Side B
"Don't Let the Stars Get in Your Eyes"
"Trying"
"Half of Your Love"
"A Little Bird Told Me So"
"Endless Love"
"All the Time"

Let Me Belong to You (1970)

Side A
"Pledging My Love"
"Let Me Belong to You"
"I'm the One to Do It"
"Baby"
"Born to Lose"

Side B
"Call Me Darling"
"Love Is Ending"
"Baby Don't You Do It"
"I Need You So"
"Play It Fair"

Woke Up This Mornin' (1992)

References

External links

Biography of Lavern Baker 
Discography of Lavern Baker

1929 births
1997 deaths
Actresses from Illinois
20th-century African-American women singers
American expatriates in the Philippines
American film actresses
American gospel singers
American rhythm and blues singers
American television actresses
Atlantic Records artists
Brunswick Records artists
Singers from Chicago
Jump blues musicians
20th-century American actresses
20th-century American singers
20th-century American women singers